Nathan Inyom is an Anglican bishop in Nigeria. From 1990 he has been the Bishop of Makurdi, one of 13 dioceses of the Anglican Province of Abuja, itself one of 14 provinces of the Church of Nigeria.

Notes

Living people
Anglican bishops of Makurdi
20th-century Anglican bishops in Nigeria
21st-century Anglican bishops in Nigeria
Year of birth missing (living people)